Microbacterium natoriense is a Gram-positive and rod-shaped bacterium from the genus Microbacterium which has been isolated from soil from Natori in Japan. Microbacterium natoriense produces D-aminoacylase.

References

Further reading

External links
Type strain of Microbacterium natoriense at BacDive -  the Bacterial Diversity Metadatabase	

Bacteria described in 2005
natoriense